Mexico competed at the 2022 World Aquatics Championships in Budapest, Hungary from 18 June to 3 July.

Artistic swimming 

Mexico entered 14 artistic swimmers.

Women

Mixed

Diving

Mexico entered 10 divers.

Men

Women

Mixed

Open water swimming

Mexico entered 6 open water swimmers (3 male and 3 female )

Men

Women

Mixed

Swimming

Mexico entered 6 swimmers.
Men

Women

References

Nations at the 2022 World Aquatics Championships
2022
World Aquatics Championships